Sanjay Tandon (born 10 September 1963) is an Indian politician in the Bhartiya Janata Party. He is currently the State president of Bhartiya Janata Party from Chandigarh.
His father was Balramji Das Tandon, who was a BJP leader of Punjab, who served as a Municipal Councilor in Punjab for 14 years and won 6 assembly elections in Punjab. Sanjay has written his father's biography titled "Balramji Dass Tandon: Ek Prerak Charitra" which was released by Shri L. K. Advani at the Tagore Theatre in Chandigarh along with Sardar Parkash Singh Badal.
His father-in-law was Justice Madan Mohan Punchhi who retired as Chief Justice of India in 1998.

Education
Tandon completed his high school education from DAV Public School, Sector 8 in Chandigarh. Following which, Tandon did his B.Com (with Hons. in Accountancy) from Post Graduate Government College - 11, Chandigarh (then known as Government College for Men), Chandigarh; affiliated to  Panjab University, Chandigarh. He is a Fellow Member of the Institute of Chartered Accountants of India and also an Associate Member of the Institute of Cost Accountants of India.

Professional career
 Managing Partner of a Chartered Accounting firm (S. Tandon & Associates), well known for auditing and consulting services.
 His company Competent Synergies runs call centres and BPOs which provide direct and indirect employment to over 5,000 people.

He is currently –
 A member of the Administrator's Advisory Council, Chandigarh Administration.
 A member of the Standing Committee, Law & Order, Home Department, Chandigarh Administration.
 A member of D.A.V. Management Committee Pratinidhi Sabha
 Associated with the Bharat Vikas Parishad, Chandigarh
 A Non-Official Visitor of Model Jail Burail

 He has served as Director of State Bank of Hyderabad (A subsidiary of State Bank of India)
 He was also Director of National Hydroelectric Power Corporation Limited (A Government of India Enterprise)
 Member of Information and Communication Technology Corporation, Punjab for Human Resource Development in IT/ITES
 Member of the Committee of Finance, Banking, Insurance and Capital Market of PHD Chamber of Commerce
 Member of the Task Force for Institute of Chartered Accountants of India (for Punjab)
 Member of the Committee to discharge the functions of the Board of Studies in Human Rights & Duties, Panjab University, Chandigarh
 He has been a regular speaker at the Confederation of Indian Industry (CII) on the topic of the Annual Budget.
 He has often spoken at the Institute of Chartered Accountants of India, Chandigarh Chapter, where he addresses CA Final students as a part of the General Management and Communication Skills (GMCS) programme on the topic of 'Leadership & Motivation'.

Political career
 Tandon's political career began in 1991 when he was made the in-charge of the Lok Sabha election in the Amritsar constituency for BJP.
 In 1993, he played the role of the election in-charge of the Lok Sabha election for the BJP from Jalandhar constituency.
 Tandon became a member of the BJP Executive in Chandigarh in 1995.
 In 1997, he was made the in-charge of the Assembly election for BJP from the Rajpura constituency (Punjab)
 Tandon became the convener of the Chartered Accountant Cell of BJP Chandigarh
 Again in 2002, he was made the in-charge of Assembly elections for BJP in the Rajpura constituency (Punjab)
 In 2007, Tandon took over as the General Secretary of BJP Chandigarh
 Tandon launched the monthly magazine of the party called 'Chandigarh Kamal Samachar' in 2009
 The website of the party was launched in late 2009 – BJPChandigarh.org
 In the year 2009, He was made the in-charge of the Lok Sabha election when Satya Pal Jain contested from the Chandigarh seat for BJP
 January 2010, Tandon was elected as the State President of BJP Chandigarh
 Tandon was re-elected as the State President of BJP Chandigarh in January 2013

Published writing
He has co-authored seven books with his wife Priya S. Tandon. Each of the books in the Sunrays series contain 52 Inspirational Short Stories. They are –

He also wrote his father's biography titled 'Balramji Das Tandon – Ek Prerak Charitra'. The foreword for the same has been written by senior leaders like – Sh. K. C. Sudarshan, Sh. Atal Bihari Vajpayee, Sh. L.K. Advani, Sh. Rajnath Singh, Sh. Prakash Singh Badal, Sh. Narendra Modi, Sh. Murli Manohar Joshi, Sh. M. Venkaiah Naidu, Sh. Arun Jaitley, Sh. Balbir Punj

Social Service
Tandon runs an NGO by the name of Competent Foundation which is regularly involved in the following activities:
 A free pre-school for poor children in a colony in Chandigarh.
 A weekly Langar, every Tuesday evening in a temple in Sector 18, Chandigarh since 2008.
 Biannual blood donation camps 20 of which have already been held, collecting a total of 5750 blood units.
 Regular support to the poor for medical purposes like – orthopaedic surgery, chemotherapy, cataract surgery, drug de-addiction treatment and provision of medicines.
 Disposal of unclaimed dead bodies

References

External links
 

1963 births
Living people
Chandigarh politicians
Indian accountants
20th-century Indian biographers
Writers from Amritsar
Dayanand Anglo-Vedic Schools System alumni
Bharatiya Janata Party politicians from Chandigarh
Panjab University alumni